DT Racer is a racing game developed by South Korean studio Axis Entertainment released exclusively on PlayStation platforms by XS Games in 2005. This game was based heavily on the game "Axel Impact" released by Axis Entertainment in 2003, exclusively in South Korea. Notable changes between "Axel Impact" and "DT Racer" include menu design, some sound effects, and the soundtrack.

References

2005 video games
Racing video games
PlayStation 2 games
PlayStation Portable games
Video games developed in South Korea
XS Games games
Multiplayer and single-player video games